The Spring Garden Street Tunnel is a vehicular tunnel under the Philadelphia Museum of Art.  The tunnel once carried the SEPTA Route 43 trolley.

Gallery

References

Tunnels in Philadelphia
Transportation in Philadelphia